Allan Alfred Montgomery (22 August 1920 – 2 May 1982) was an Australian rules footballer who played for the North Melbourne Football Club in the Victorian Football League (VFL).

Notes

External links 

1920 births
1982 deaths
Australian rules footballers from Melbourne
North Melbourne Football Club players
People from Kensington, Victoria